Camaegeria sophax is a moth of the family Sesiidae first described by Herbert Druce in 1899. It is known from Malawi, Mozambique, Uganda and Zimbabwe.

References
Druce, H. (1899). "Descriptions of some new species of Heterocera. Fam. Aegeriidae". Annals and Magazine of Natural History. (7) 4 (21): 200–205.
Bartsch D. & Berg J. (2012). "New Species and review of the Afrotropical clearwing moths genus Camaegeria Strand, 1914 (Lep.: Sesiidae: Synanthedonini)". Zootaxa. 3181: 28–46.

Sesiidae
Moths described in 1899
Lepidoptera of Uganda
Lepidoptera of Mozambique
Lepidoptera of Malawi
Lepidoptera of Zimbabwe
Moths of Sub-Saharan Africa